Zalesie-Stefanowo  is a village in the administrative district of Gmina Czyżew-Osada, within Wysokie Mazowieckie County, Podlaskie Voivodeship, in north-eastern Poland.

References

Zalesie-Stefanowo